Glasgow Sunday is the second of four albums released in 2005 by musician Jandek on Corwood Industries, as (0779). His 41st overall, it was recorded live on October 17, 2004 at The Arches, Glasgow, as part of the Instal festival. This was the first known live appearance of Jandek, who played unannounced with backing from Richard Youngs on bass and Alex Neilson on drums.

A DVD of this performance was released on June 15, 2006. Like the original album (and all of Jandek's previous output), it was released by Corwood Industries and shares the same catalog number as the CD version, albeit with the suffix "DVD" attached (0779-DVD). It is Corwood's first ever home video release.  The DVD was filmed using two cameras - one focused entirely on Jandek, and the other situated farther from the stage and alternating between a wide shot of the stage and closer shots of Youngs and Nielson. The DVD gives the viewers three angle options - either of the two cameras, or a mix of both angles

Track listing

See also
 Corwood Industries discography

References

External links 
 Corwood Industries homepage 
 Guide to Jandek by Seth Tisue
 about Jandek's live performances

Jandek live albums
2005 live albums